The Mask of Love is a 1917 American short silent crime film directed by Joe De Grasse and starring Lon Chaney and Pauline Bush. The film is considered lost.

Chaney biographer Jon C. Mirsalis states: "As is the case for Accusing Evidence (1916), it is highly unlikely that (The Mask of Love) was shot in 1917. It may be a reissue of an earlier film when Bush and Chaney were working together, although no other film's synopsis matches this very closely. It could also have been assembled from footage leftover from The Menace to Carlotta (1914), or it may have just been shot previously and never released." Pauline Bush was no longer working at Universal in 1917.

Plot
Carlotta and her elderly father live in poverty, and are befriended by Marino (Lon Chaney), a tough criminal. Marino pretends to want to help them, but he attempts to rape Carlotta. Peter, an old friend of Carlotta's, happens along in time to rescue her. Carlotta's father learns of Marino's attempted rape of his daughter and swears revenge. He confronts Marino and they fight. Marino is just about to stab Carlotta's father when he receives a beating from Peter. Carlotta and Peter are married and make plans for a happy life together.

Cast
 Lon Chaney as Marino
 Pauline Bush as Carlotta

References

External links

1917 films
1917 short films
American silent short films
American black-and-white films
1917 crime films
Films directed by Joseph De Grasse
Universal Pictures short films
American crime films
1910s American films